Jawahar Navodaya Vidyalaya, Kangra, locally known as JNV Paprola, is a boarding, co-educational school in Kangra district of Himachal Pradesh state in India. Navodaya Vidyalayas are funded by the Indian Ministry of Human Resources Development and administered  by Navodaya Vidyalaya Smiti, an autonomous body under the ministry.

History 
The school was established in 1987, and is a part of Jawahar Navodaya Vidyalaya schools. The permanent campus of this school is located at Paprola, Kangra. This school is administered and monitored by Chandigarh regional office of Navodaya Vidyalaya Smiti. It comes under the ministry of human resources and development.

Admissions 
Students are admitted by the Jawahar Navodaya Vidyalaya selection test.

Affiliations 
JNV Kangra is affiliated to Central Board of Secondary Education with affiliation number 640006, following the curriculum prescribed by CBSE.

References

External links 
 Official website of JNV Kangra

High schools and secondary schools in Himachal Pradesh
Kangra
Educational institutions established in 1987
1987 establishments in Himachal Pradesh
Education in Kangra district